

The Kaić surname through centuries in Austro-Hungary

In Bačka (Bachka) during the Austro-Hungarian rule, the Slavic surnames ending with sound [ć] were often spelled according to German writing and the Latin spelling was used:
  Kai[ch]
also according to Hungarian spelling as:
  Kai[ts]  /  Kai[cs]  /  K[á]i[cs]  /  Kai[ty]  /  K[á]i[ty]
or even a mixture:
  K[á]i[ch]
While for comparison those Kaić's who lived under Venetian rule wrote their surname according to Italian spelling as:
  Cai[ch]

Such spelling deviation highlights the complications in naming conventions the south Slavic people were exposed under various foreign rules in the past centuries. This often created havoc and confusion for them in official and legal matters.
While the same spelling deviation of the past, now represents a major headache for any genealogy research.

The surname Kaity in English speaking countries

The Kaity families (and individuals) as they soon found out at their initial arrival, run out of luck as far as their surname goes, since Kaity is also a name for women derived from Catherine.
It is therefore quite likely that some of those families converted their surname promptly to Kaich.

The word kaić is Croatian and is translated in English as boat.

Surnames

hr:Kaić